Devil Between My Toes is the debut studio album by American indie rock band Guided by Voices.

Background 
The album was recorded at Steve Wilbur's home and was self financed. Only 300 original pressings were released.

Music and lyrics 
Devil Between My Toes has been described as post-punk. In an article for HHVmag, writer Bjorn Bischoff stated, "Influences of R.E.M. and post-punk can be heard, but also the charming touch of Guided By Voices itself. While in "A Portrait Destroyed by Fire" the guitar intones a swan song, "Discussing Wallace Chambers" delivers much more light-hearted tones that anticipate part of the band's future sound.

Track listing

Personnel

Guided by Voices 

 Robert Pollard – guitar, vocals
 Kevin Fennell – drums
 Peyton Eric – drums
 Steve Wilbur – guitar
 Mitch Mitchell – bass guitar
 Tobin Sprout – guitar, backing vocals

Technical 

 Donnie Kraft – mastering
 Steve Wilbur – engineering

References 

Guided by Voices albums
1987 debut albums